Manolis Papamattheakis (born 9 April 1972) is a Greek football manager.

References

1972 births
Living people
Greek football managers
O.F. Ierapetra F.C. managers
Ermis Zoniana F.C. managers
Irodotos FC managers
A.E. Karaiskakis F.C. managers
Aiolikos F.C. managers
People from Heraklion